UFC Fight Night: Bader vs. Saint Preux (also known as UFC Fight Night 47) was a mixed martial arts event held on August 16, 2014, at the Cross Insurance Center in Bangor, Maine.

Background
The event was headlined by top ten light heavyweights Ryan Bader and Ovince Saint Preux.

The event was the first hosted in Maine.

As a result of the cancellation of UFC 176, bouts between Bobby Green vs. Abel Trujillo, Jussier Formiga vs. Zach Makovsky and Gray Maynard vs. Fabrício Camões were rescheduled for this event.  Subsequently, Green was removed from his fight on July 11 in favor of a bout as an injury replacement for Michael Johnson against Josh Thomson at UFC on Fox 12 on July 26, 2014. Trujillo was expected to face Ross Pearson.

On August 4, Trujillo pulled out of the Pearson bout and was replaced by Gray Maynard.  In turn, Maynard's originally scheduled opponent Fabrício Camões was removed from the card entirely and was rebooked for a separate event with a new opponent.

Results

Bonus awards
The following fighters were awarded $50,000 bonuses:

 Fight of the Night: Alan Jouban vs. Seth Baczynski
 Performance of the Night: Thiago Tavares and Tim Boetsch

See also
List of UFC events
2014 in UFC

References

UFC Fight Night
Mixed martial arts in Maine
Sports in Bangor, Maine
2014 in mixed martial arts